In mathematics, and especially differential topology and singularity theory, the Eisenbud–Levine–Khimshiashvili signature formula gives a way of computing the Poincaré–Hopf index of a real, analytic vector field at an algebraically isolated singularity.  It is named after David Eisenbud, Harold I. Levine, and George Khimshiashvili.  Intuitively, the index of a vector field near a zero is the number of times the vector field wraps around the sphere.  Because analytic vector fields have a rich algebraic structure, the techniques of commutative algebra can be brought to bear to compute their index.  The signature formula expresses the index of an analytic vector field in terms of the signature of a certain quadratic form.

Nomenclature 
Consider the n-dimensional space Rn. Assume that Rn has some fixed coordinate system, and write x for a point in Rn, where 

Let X be a vector field on Rn. For  there exist functions  such that one may express X as

To say that X is an analytic vector field means that each of the functions   is an analytic function. One says that X is singular at a point p in Rn (or that p is a singular point of X) if , i.e. X vanishes at p. In terms of the functions  it means that  for all . A singular point p of X is called isolated (or that p is an isolated singularity of X) if  and there exists an open neighbourhood , containing p, such that  for all q in U, different from p. An isolated singularity of X is called algebraically isolated if, when considered over the complex domain, it remains isolated.

Since the Poincaré–Hopf index at a point is a purely local invariant (cf. Poincaré–Hopf theorem), one may restrict one's study to that of germs. Assume that each of the ƒk from above are function germs, i.e.  In turn, one may call X a vector field germ.

Construction 
Let An,0 denote the ring of analytic function germs . Assume that X is a vector field germ of the form

with an algebraically isolated singularity at 0. Where, as mentioned above, each of the ƒk are function germs . Denote by IX the ideal generated by the ƒk, i.e.  Then one considers the local algebra, BX, given by the quotient

The Eisenbud–Levine–Khimshiashvili signature formula states that the index of the vector field X at 0 is given by the signature of a certain non-degenerate bilinear form (to be defined below) on the local algebra BX.

X has an algebraically isolated singularity at 0 in Rn. In this case, BX will be a finite-dimensional, real algebra.

Definition of the bilinear form 
Using the analytic components of X, one defines another analytic germ  given by

for all . Let  denote the determinant of the Jacobian matrix of F with respect to the basis  Finally, let  denote the equivalence class of JF, modulo IX. Using ∗ to denote multiplication in BX one is able to define a non-degenerate bilinear form β as follows:

where  is any linear function such that

As mentioned: the signature of β is exactly the index of X at 0.

Example 
Consider the case  of a vector field on the plane. Consider the case where X is given by

The first step for finding the non-degenerate, bilinear form β is to calculate the multiplication table of BX; reducing each entry modulo IX. Whence

One may take

This choice was made so that  as was required by the hypothesis, and to make the calculations involve integers, as opposed to fractions. Applying this to the multiplication table gives the matrix representation of the bilinear form β with respect to the given basis:

It follows that X has Poincaré–Hopf index +3 at the origin.

Topological verification 
With this particular choice of X it is possible to verify the Poincaré–Hopf index is +3 by a direct application of the definition of Poincaré–Hopf index. This is very rarely the case, and was the reason for the choice of example. If one takes polar coordinates on the plane, i.e.  and  then  and  Restrict X to a circle, centre 0, radius , denoted by C0,ε; and consider the map  given by

The Poincaré–Hopf index of X is, by definition, the topological degree of the map G. Restricting X to the circle C0,ε, for arbitrarily small ε, gives

meaning that as θ makes one rotation about the circle C0,ε in an anti-clockwise direction; the image G(θ) makes three complete, anti-clockwise rotations about the unit circle C0,1. Meaning that the topological degree of G is +3 and that the Poincaré–Hopf index of X at 0 is +3.

References 

Theorems in differential topology
Singularity theory